The paradise jacamar (Galbula dea) is a species of bird in the family Galbulidae. It is found in Bolivia, Brazil, Ecuador, French Guiana, Guyana, Peru, Suriname, and Venezuela.

Taxonomy and systematics

Early in the 20th century the paradise jacamar was placed in the monotypic genus Urogalba, but it has been in Galbula since the middle of the century. It has four subspecies, the nominate Galbula dea dea, G. d. amazonum, G. d. brunneiceps, and G. d. phainopepla. It is possible that they are actually clinal variations of one species.

Description

Both sexes of the nominate have a dark brown crown and are glossy black on the rest of the upper parts. They have a white throat and upper breast; the rest of the underparts are blackish. The other subspecies differ in a few ways. G. d. amazonums crown is lighter and the white throat more extensive, and G. d. phainopepla is similar to it. G. d. brunneicepss crown is lighter and its upper parts have a bronzy greenish sheen.

Distribution and habitat

The paradise jacamar is found throughout most of the Amazon Basin. The subspecies are distributed thus:

G. d. dea: from the upper Orinoco River in southern Venezuela east through the Guianas and in Brazil north of the Amazon River.
G. d. amazonum: north central Brazil south to northern Mato Grosso state and northern Bolivia.
G. d. brunneiceps: southeastern Colombia, eastern Ecuador and Peru, and western Brazil south of the Amazon and west of the Negro River.
G. d. phainopepla: western Brazil south of the Amazon and west of the Madeira River.

The paradise jacamar mostly inhabits terra firme, várzea, and savanna forests, both primary and secondary. It is also found in dry forest and gallery forest. It is most often found along edges or in open areas such as clearings and treefalls, and rarely in the forest interior. Unusually for a jacamar, it is mostly seen in the canopy rather than the mid level.

Behavior

Feeding

The paradise jacamar's diet is primarily Lepidoptera, Odonata, Diptera, and Hymenoptera, but it also takes other flying insects. It perches on exposed branches by itself, in pairs, or in small groups and sallies out to catch its prey. It sometimes joins mixed-species foraging flocks in the canopy.

Breeding

A pair of paradise jacamars was seen excavating a burrow in an arboreal termite nest, and pairs have often been seen near such nests. No other information about the species' breeding phenology has been recorded.

Vocalization

The paradise jacamar's song is "a well-spaced “peep peep peep peep peep peep pee pee pe pe”, usually descending, becoming slightly faster and weaker towards [the] end" . Its calls are variously "a single 'pip', 'peeap' or 'glewweh .

Status

The IUCN has assessed the paradise jacamar as being of Least Concern. It varies from rare to common throughout its range and has been recorded in many protected areas. "No immediate threats are known, but general habitat destruction presumably continues to reduce populations."

References

External links 
Paradise jacamar videos in the Internet Bird Collection
BirdLife Species Factsheet
Stamps (for Guyana) with range map (not accurate)
Paradise jacamar photo gallery VIREO Photo-High Res

paradise jacamar
Birds of the Amazon Basin
Birds of the Guianas
paradise jacamar
paradise jacamar
Birds of Brazil